Duquesnoy is a surname, and may refer to:

 Adrien Duquesnoy (1759–1808), French political figure during the French Revolution
 Ernest Dominique François Joseph Duquesnoy (1749–1795), Radical French political figure during the French Revolution and brother of Florent Joseph Duquesnoy
 Florent Joseph Duquesnoy (1761–1801), French general during the French Revolution and brother of Ernest Dominique François Joseph Duquesnoy
 François Duquesnoy (1597–1643), Flemish sculptor of the Baroque period
 Jerôme Duquesnoy (II) (1602–1654), Flemish architect and sculptor of the Baroque period
 Tom Duquesnoy (born 1993), French mixed martial artist